Nueva Ecija's 2nd congressional district is one of the four congressional districts of the Philippines in the province of Nueva Ecija. It has been represented in the House of Representatives of the Philippines since 1928. The district consists of the northern cities of Muñoz and San Jose, as well as adjacent municipalities of Carranglan,Pantabangan, Lanera, Rizal and Talugtug. It is currently represented in the 18th Congress by Joseph Gilbert F. Violago of the National Unity Party (NUP).

Representation history

Election results

2022

2019

2016

2013

2010

See also
Legislative districts of Nueva Ecija

References

Congressional districts of the Philippines
Politics of Nueva Ecija
1926 establishments in the Philippines
Congressional districts of Central Luzon
Constituencies established in 1926
Constituencies established in 1987
Constituencies disestablished in 1972